Japan competed at the 2022 World Games held in Birmingham, United States from 7 to 17 July 2022. Athletes representing Japan won 10 gold medals, 11 silver medals and 12 bronze medals. The country finished in 8th place in the medal table.

Medalists

| width=78% align=left valign=top |

Invitational sports

Competitors
The following is the list of number of competitors in the Games.

Air sports

Japan competed in drone racing.

Archery

Japan competed in archery.

Canoe marathon

Japan competed in canoe marathon.

Cue sports

Japan won one bronze medal in cue sports.

Dancesport

Japan won three medals in dancesport.

Duathlon

Japan won one silver medal in duathlon.

Finswimming

Japan competed in finswimming.

Flag football

Japan competed in flag football.

Flying disc

Japan competed in the flying disc competition.

Karate

Japan won three medals in karate.

Men

Women

Lacrosse

Japan won the bronze medal in the men's lacrosse tournament.

Lifesaving

Japan won one bronze medal in lifesaving.

Parkour

Japan won two bronze medals in parkour.

Powerlifting

Japan won two gold medals in powerlifting.

Racquetball

Japan competed in racquetball.

Rhythmic gymnastics

Japan competed in rhythmic gymnastics.

Softball

Japan won the silver medal in the softball tournament.

Sport climbing 

Japan won six medals in sport climbing.

Squash

Japan competed in squash.

Sumo

Japan won nine medals in sumo.

Trampoline gymnastics

Japan won one bronze medal in trampoline gymnastics.

Water skiing

Japan won one gold medal in water skiing.

Wheelchair rugby

Japan won the silver medal in the wheelchair rugby tournament.

References

Nations at the 2022 World Games
2022
World Games